Theog is a town and a municipal committee as well as a tehsil  in Shimla district in the Indian state of Himachal Pradesh. It's just 26 km from state capital Shimla. First settlements were in 1902.

Demographics/History
 India census, Theog had a population of 3,754. Males constitute 57% of the population and females 43%. Theog has an average literacy rate of 64%, : male literacy is 73%, and female literacy is 56%. In Theog, 12% of the population is under 6 years of age. According to the census of 1931, the total population of Theog state was 6912; there were 6800 Hindus, 91 muslims and 21 Sikhs in Theog State in 1931.

The Chandel rulers of Theog share a common line of descent with the founders of Ghund clan and Dharampur Madhan, clan who were all together sons of a Chandel Rajput of Jaipur. The state was made subordinate to Keonthal Estate  by a sanad of September 1815.

Theog was Ziladari of CHANDEL Clan

Geography

It has an average elevation of 1965 metres (6446 feet).
It is situated on National Highway NH22 (on the Hindustan-Tibet Road), is 32 km away from Shimla, and is a town of five 'Ghats' (or ridges): Rahi Ghat, Deori Ghat, Prem Ghat, Janoghat, and Bagaghat.

There are numerous villages which come under the jurisdiction of Theog.

Villages
 

Jaiee

Transport
Theog is well connected to Himachal and rest of India through National Highway 5 and National Highway 705. theog is 45 km from Shimla airport and 32 km from Shimla railway station

See also
Theog-Kumarsain (Vidhan Sabha constituency)

References

External links
 Theog on Google Maps

Cities and towns in Shimla district
Tehsils of Himachal Pradesh